Aleš Šteger (born 31 May 1973) is a  Slovene poet, writer, editor and literary critic. Aleš belongs to a generation of writers that started to publish right after the fall of Yugoslavia. His first poetry collection Šahovnice ur (1995) was sold out in three weeks after publication and indicated a new generation of Slovenian artists and writers.

Career
Štegers books have been translated into 16 languages and his poems appeared in internationally renowned magazines and newspapers as The New Yorker, Die Zeit, Neue Zürcher Zeitung, TLS and many others. Among other prizes and honours his English translation of Knjiga reči (The Book of Things, BOA Editions, 2010) won two mayor U.S. translation awards (BTBA award and AATSEL).

Aleš received the title Chevalier dans le ordre des Arts et des Lettres from the French State. He is a member of the Akademie der Künste in Berlin.

Besides writing and translating from German and Spanish Aleš is also the programme director of Beletrina academic Press that he co-funded (www.studentskazalozba.org).

From 1995 to 2004 and from 2008 to present, he was the initiator and programme director of the international poetry festival Days of Poetry and Wine (www.stihoteka.si). He worked also as programme director of the Terminal 12 - programme strand at the Maribor 2012 European Capital of Culture.
Since 2012 he is working on a performative writing project Written on Site, making one public writing performance each year.   
Among his editorial work, the most noticeable is a new revisited collection of poems by Edvard Kocbek published in 2004, which includes a number of Kocbek's unpublished poems as well as an insightful essay on Kocbek's poetic language written by Šteger. His editorial work also includes other major Slovenian poets, Gregor Strniša, Dane Zajc, Tomaž Šalamun and Niko Grafenauer.

In 1998 Šteger won the Veronika Award for his poetry collection Kašmir and in 2008 he won the Rožanc Award, the highest prize for essays written in Slovene, for Berlin. In 2019 he was a contributor to A New Divan: A Lyrical Dialogue Between East and West (Gingko Library).

Šteger is a judge for the 2021 Griffin Poetry Prize.

Quotes 
“Simply one of the most enjoyable poets to read in Europe right now, Aleš Šteger is cultivated and often brilliant poet. He maintains an air of philosophical sophistication while imbuing his work with a laconic nature and aberrant minimalism that makes it distinct and vivid in the memory. A leading light in the rich Slovenian poetry community.”

3:AM Magazine, Maintenant #45

“Šteger focuses on things, a central concern of European philosophy ever since Husserl, and of European poetry since Rilke. Šteger takes an original approach to this question by not systematically pursuing the “thing-in-itself” and attempting to bring words as close as possible to it, as Francis Ponge did.”

Poetry Today, The Antioch Review, Volume 70, Number 1, 2012 about “The Book of Things”

"Steger has a tremendous capacity for juxtaposition, and the poems offer a great many startlingly moments…[His] flair is in not pausing at the virtuoso moment but brushing past as it drops."

Rain Taxi

"…the things described in this book are defamiliarized and here, often, Steger is at his best. The way he personifies an object, or the metaphor he uses, is never obvious, but it always makes complete sense."

Three Percent Review, "The Book of Things"

"...a smart, startling, and wildly pleasurable book.”

Kenyon Review (online), "The Book of Things"

Steger’s efforts sometimes bring to mind such Western European figures as Francis Ponge and Craig Raine, who also sought to make household things look new and strange. Yet Steger brings a melancholy Central European sense of history- his objects tend to remember, or cause, great pain: “It pours, this poisonous, sweet force,” Steger writes of “Saliva,” “Between teeth, when you spit your own little genocide.”

Publishers Weekly, “The Book of Things”

It is a rare treat to have an English translation before the ink has dried on the original. By which I mean, a mere five years after the book’s Slovenian publication, Brian Henry has brought these poems to life for those of us not lucky enough to read Slovenian. Henry’s translations are impressive for sheer acrobatics.

Guernica, a Magazine of Art and Politics, “The Book Of Things”

Poetry
 Šahovnice ur (Chessboards of Hours) 1995
 Kašmir (Kashmir) 1997
 Protuberance (Protuberances) 2002
 Knjiga reči (The Book of Things) 2005
 Knjiga teles (The Book of Bodies) 2010
 Nad nebom pod zemljo, 2015

Prose
 Včasih je januar sredi poletja (January in the Middle of Summer), a travelogue of a journey through Peru, 1997
 Berlin, short stories, 2007
 Odpusti, 2014
 Kurent, 2015
 Absolution, Istros Books, 2017

Essays 
 S prsti in peto, 2009
 Na kraju zapisano 1 (Ljubljana), 2012
 Na kraju zapisano 2 (Fukushima), 2013
 Na kraju zapisano 3 (Ciudad de Mexico), 2014
 Na kraju zapisano 4 (Belgrade) 2015

Books of Aleš Šteger in translation 
 1996 Solitude, University of Tennessee at Chattanooga.
 2000 Kašmir, Drewo a srd, Bratislava.
 2001 Kaschmir, Edition Korrespondenzen, Wien.
 2001 Regreso a casa, Beletrina, Ljubljana.
 2002 Leden je nĕkdy uprostřed léta, Vetrny Mlyny, Brno.
 2003 Protuberance, Drevo a srd, Bratislava.
 2003 Protuberance, Meandar, Zagreb.
 2003 Protuberance, PAN, Sofia.
 2005 Protuberancias, Ediciones Arlequín, Guadalajara.
 2005 Poezija Apsimoka, Vario Burnos, Vilnius.
 2006 Protuberancia, Veszprem, Szeged.
 2006 Buch der Dinge, Suhrkamp, Frankfurt a M..
 2006 Pesme, Društvo pisaca Makedonije, Skopje.
 2006 Knjiga rijeći, Bosanska rijeć, Tuzla.
 2006 Libro de las cosas, Casa de la Poesia, Costa Rica.
 2006 Tingens bok, Rámus, Malmö.
 2007 Katkad je siječanj usred ljeta, Meandar, Zagreb.
 2008 Geburt eines Engels, (co-author), Wunderhorn, Mainz.
 2009 Preussenpark, Suhrkamp, Frankfurt a. M.
 2009 Berlin, Arhipelag, Beograd.
 2009 Berlino, Zandonai, Trento.
 2010 Berlin, Meandar, Zagreb.
 2010 El Guant, Pen Catala, Barcelona.
 2010 The Book of Things, BOA Editions, Rochester.
 2010 Aspirin. Poetry East-West, Peking Los Angeles.
 2011 Ponekogaše Januari srede leto. Blesok, Skopje.
 2011 Berlín. Pre-Textos, Valencia.
 2011 Edinstvanea obumamec na kamčka, Sofia.
 2011 Der Handschuh, Edition Thanhäusser, Ottensheim.
 2012 Buch der Körper, Schöffling & Co., Frankfurt am Main.
 2012 Odbrani pesmi, Menora, Skopje.
 2014 Einsteinov stolp, IPPH, Beijing.
 2014  Zapopan, Mexico.
 2014 Berlin, Vetrny Mlyny, Brno.
 2016 Archiv der toten Seelen, Schöffling & Co., Frankfurt am Main.

Aleš Šteger as translator 
 1997 Gottfried Benn: Dvojno življenje, Beletrina, Ljubljana
 2000 Michael Donhauser: Meridiani, Beletrina, Ljubljana
 2002 Peter Huchel: Pod koreniko osata, Litera, Maribor
 2004 Pablo Neruda: Lirika, Mladinska knjiga, Ljubljana
 2006 Ingeborg Bachmann: Razloži, ljubi, Mohorjeva, Celovec.
 2009 Olga Orozco: Na koncu je bil glagol, Mladinska Knjiga, Ljubljana.
 2009 Durs Grünbein: Pregibi in pasti, Študentska založba, Ljubljana.
 2010 César Vallejo: Pesmi človeka, Kud Logos, Ljubljana.

References 

Short biography
 Grigore, Rodica. Aleš Šteger, Iartă. Măști și carnavaluri. In: Revista Transilvania, no. 6-7, 2022, p.87-91  .https://doi.org/10.51391/trva.2022.06-07.10

External links
Aleš Šteger's homepage
English translation of two poems at Guernica

1973 births
Living people
Slovenian poets
Slovenian male poets
Slovenian essayists
Slovenian translators
People from Ptuj
Slovenian editors
Veronika Award laureates
University of Ljubljana alumni
Members of the Academy of Arts, Berlin